David Henry Leroy (born August 16, 1947) is an American lawyer and politician from Idaho. He is a past lieutenant governor and attorney general of Idaho. He was the state's 36th lieutenant governor between 1983 and 1987, the final four years of the administration of Governor John V. Evans.

Leroy was appointed by President George H. W. Bush as United States Nuclear Waste Negotiator in 1990, and served in that capacity until 1993. He has been a practicing attorney in Boise since 1988, and deals with government and administrative law issues, criminal defense and family law trials, hearings, litigation, and counsel at local, state, and federal local levels.

Leroy is a self-taught Abraham Lincoln expert, and founded the Idaho Lincoln Institute.

Education 
Leroy graduated from Lewiston High School in 1965, then attended the University of Idaho in Moscow, where he was ASUI president (1967–68) and a member of Sigma Alpha Epsilon fraternity. After receiving a bachelor's degree in business in 1969, he continued at the College of Law and earned a J.D. degree in 1971, then added an LL.M. degree at New York University.

Career

Ada County Prosecuting Attorney 
Was elected prosecuting attorney in Ada County, Idaho, in 1974 and served two terms.

Attorney General 
At age 31, Leroy was elected Attorney General of Idaho in 1978, easily defeating Boise attorney Mike Wetherell for the open seat. At the time, he was the youngest attorney general in the nation.

Lieutenant Governor 
He was elected lieutenant governor in 1982 and succeeded Phil Batt, who was the Republican nominee for governor that year.

Gubernatorial 
Leroy was Republican nominee for governor in 1986, but narrowly lost in the general election to former Democratic Governor Cecil Andrus.

Nuclear Waste Negotiator

Leroy was appointed the first head of the Office of the United States Nuclear Waste Negotiator in 1990, which identified Native American tribes that could host spent nuclear fuel. In a 1991 speech to the National Congress of American Indians, Leroy stated the Native American's tradition of long-term culture made them especially suited for storing nuclear waste, including quotes from Chief Seattle. This led to sharp negative reactions from the audience, calling it Machiavellian and Orwellian.

Idaho's 1st Congressional District 
In 1994, Leroy ran for Congress in the first district and finished second in the Republican primary, behind Helen Chenoweth with 27.8% of the vote.

Leroy announced his candidacy for the open seat in Congress in Idaho's first district on May 12, 2017. He lost the Republican primary in May 2018 to Russ Fulcher, taking second with 15.6% of the vote.

Personal 
Leroy is a grandfather with two children, Jordan a lawyer and mom, and Adam, an archaeologist and father. Leroy's wife Nancy is a former Miss Boise and Miss Boise State University, and has a degree in Sociology from BSU.

In 2009, Leroy signed a petition in support of Polish film director Roman Polanski, calling for his release after he was arrested in Switzerland in relation to his 1977 charge for drugging and anally raping a 13-year-old girl.

Notes

|-

|-

|-

1947 births
Idaho Attorneys General
1986 Idaho elections
1994 Idaho elections
1978 Idaho elections
Idaho lawyers
Idaho Republicans
Lieutenant Governors of Idaho
Living people
New York University School of Law alumni
Politicians from Seattle
University of Idaho alumni
University of Idaho College of Law alumni